Laurent Burtz (born 25 April 1973 in Bourgoin-Jallieu) is a French slalom canoeist who competed from the mid-1990s to the early 2000s (decade).

He won a bronze medal in the K1 event at the 2000 European Championships in Mezzana. Competing in two Summer Olympics, he earned his best finish of fourth in the K1 event in Atlanta in 1996.

World Cup individual podiums

References

1973 births
Canoeists at the 1996 Summer Olympics
Canoeists at the 2000 Summer Olympics
French male canoeists
Living people
Olympic canoeists of France
People from Bourgoin-Jallieu
Sportspeople from Isère